Ann Linder (born 9 June 1966) is a Swedish former freestyle swimmer. She competed in three events at the 1984 Summer Olympics.

References

External links
 

1966 births
Living people
Swedish female freestyle swimmers
Olympic swimmers of Sweden
Swimmers at the 1984 Summer Olympics
Swimmers from Gothenburg
20th-century Swedish women
21st-century Swedish women